James Martin (1807 – 1878) was a British Liberal Party politician and banker.

Early life and family
Martin was the third son of former Whig Tewkesbury MP John Martin (1774–1832) and Frances (née Stone), and brother of John Martin (1805–1880), who also served as a Whig MP for Tewkesbury. Educated at Charterhouse School, he then served in the family banking firm, Martin, Stone and Foote.

Political career
Martin was elected Liberal MP for Tewkesbury at the 1859 general election and held the seat until 1865 when he was defeated. He stood again for the seat at a by-election in 1866, but was unsuccessful.

He was also at some point a Deputy Lieutenant of Herefordshire.

References

External links
 

UK MPs 1859–1865
1807 births
1878 deaths
People educated at Charterhouse School
Deputy Lieutenants of Herefordshire
Liberal Party (UK) MPs for English constituencies
Members of the Parliament of the United Kingdom for Tewkesbury